Asja is a Slavic feminine given name, originating as a pet form of Anastasia and Anna. Notable persons with the name Asja include:

 Asja Hrvatin (born 1990), Slovene writer and researcher
 Asja Lācis (1891–1979), Latvian actress and theatre director
 Asja Maregotto (born 1997), Italian rower
 Asja Paladin (born 1994), Italian professional racing cyclist
 Asja Zenere (born 1996), Italian alpine skier

References

Feminine given names